In computer science, a trace is a set of strings, wherein certain letters in the string are allowed to commute, but others are not. It generalizes the concept of a string, by not forcing the letters to always be in a fixed order, but allowing certain reshufflings to take place.  Traces were introduced by Pierre Cartier and Dominique Foata in 1969 to give a combinatorial proof of MacMahon's master theorem.  Traces are used in theories of concurrent computation, where commuting letters stand for portions of a job that can execute independently of one another, while non-commuting letters stand for locks, synchronization points or thread joins.

The trace monoid or free partially commutative monoid is a monoid of traces. In a nutshell, it is constructed as follows: sets of commuting letters are given by an independency relation. These induce an equivalence relation of equivalent strings; the elements of the equivalence classes are the traces. The equivalence relation then partitions up the free monoid (the set of all strings of finite length) into a set of equivalence classes; the result is still a monoid; it is a quotient monoid and is called the trace monoid. The trace monoid is universal, in that all dependency-homomorphic (see below) monoids are in fact isomorphic.

Trace monoids are commonly used to model concurrent computation, forming the foundation for process calculi. They are the object of study in trace theory. The utility of trace monoids comes from the fact that they are isomorphic to the monoid of dependency graphs; thus allowing algebraic techniques to be applied to graphs, and vice versa.  They are also isomorphic to history monoids, which model the history of computation of individual processes in the context of all scheduled processes on one or more computers.

Trace
Let  denote the free monoid, that is, the set of all strings written in the alphabet . Here, the asterisk denotes, as usual, the Kleene star.

The homomorphism 

is commonly referred to as the natural homomorphism or canonical homomorphism. That the terms natural or canonical are deserved follows from the fact that this morphism embodies a universal property, as discussed in a later section.

One will also find the trace monoid denoted as  where  is the independency relation.  Confusingly, one can also find the commutation relation used instead of the independency relation (it differs by including all the diagonal elements).

Examples
Consider the alphabet . A possible dependency relation is

The corresponding independency is

Therefore, the letters  commute. Thus, for example, a trace equivalence class for the string  would be

The equivalence class  is an element of the trace monoid.

Properties
The cancellation property states that equivalence is maintained under right cancellation. That is, if , then . Here, the notation  denotes right cancellation, the removal of the first occurrence of the letter a from the string w, starting from the right-hand side. Equivalence is also maintained by left-cancellation. Several corollaries follow:

 Embedding:  if and only if  for strings x and y. Thus, the trace monoid is a syntactic monoid.
That is, .
 Projection rule: equivalence is maintained under string projection, so that if , then .

A strong form of Levi's lemma holds for traces. Specifically, if  for strings u, v, x, y, then there exist strings  and  such that 

Universal property
A dependency morphism (with respect to a dependency D) is a morphism

to some monoid M, such that the "usual" trace properties hold, namely:

1.  implies that 

2.  implies that 

3.  implies that 

4.  and  imply that  

Dependency morphisms are universal, in the sense that for a given, fixed dependency D, if  is a dependency morphism to a monoid M, then M is isomorphic to the trace monoid . In particular, the natural homomorphism is a dependency morphism.

Normal forms

There are two well-known normal forms for words in trace monoids. One is the lexicographic normal form, due to Anatolij V. Anisimov and Donald Knuth, and the other is the Foata normal form due to Pierre Cartier and Dominique Foata who studied the trace monoid for its combinatorics in the 1960s.

Unicode's Normalization Form Canonical Decomposition (NFD) is an example of a lexicographic normal form - the ordering is to sort consecutive characters with non-zero canonical combining class by that class.

Trace languages

Alternatively, but equivalently, a language  is a trace language, or is said to be consistent with dependency D if

where

is the trace closure of a set of strings.

See also
 Trace cache

Notes

References
General references

 
 Antoni Mazurkiewicz, "Introduction to Trace Theory", pp 3–41, in The Book of Traces, V. Diekert, G. Rozenberg, eds. (1995) World Scientific, Singapore 
 Volker Diekert, Combinatorics on traces, LNCS 454, Springer, 1990, pp. 9–29
 
Seminal publications
 Pierre Cartier and Dominique Foata, Problèmes combinatoires de commutation et réarrangements, Lecture Notes in Mathematics 85, Springer-Verlag, Berlin, 1969, Free 2006 reprint with new appendixes
 Antoni Mazurkiewicz, Concurrent program schemes and their interpretations, DAIMI Report PB 78, Aarhus University, 1977

Semigroup theory
Formal languages
Free algebraic structures
Combinatorics
Trace theory